Glendon Aerodrome was an aerodrome constructed in 1942 by the Royal Australian Air Force as a satellite aerodrome near Glendon, New South Wales, Australia during World War II.

The aerodrome was as a maintenance satellite field for RAAF Station Pokolbin near Cessnock.

The aerodrome was abandoned after World War II.

References

Former Royal Australian Air Force bases